Ethmia vietmiella is a moth in the family Depressariidae. It was described by Andras Kun in 2001. It is found in northern Vietnam.

References

Moths described in 2001
vietmiella